The Bishop of St. Andrews was the ecclesiastical head of the Diocese of St Andrews in the Catholic Church and then, from 14 August 1472, as Archbishop of St Andrews, the Archdiocese of St Andrews.

The name St Andrews is not the town or church's original name. Originally it was Cellrígmonaid ("church of the king's mounth" hence Cill Rìmhinn) located at Cennrígmonaid ("head of the king's mounth"); hence the town became Kilrymont (i.e. Cellrígmonaid) in the non-Gaelic orthography of the High Middle Ages. Today St Andrews has replaced both Kilrymont (and variants) as well as the older English term Anderston as the name of the town and bishopric.

The bishopric itself appears to originate in the period 700–900. By the 11th century, it is clear that it was the most important bishopric in Scotland.

List of known abbots
There had been a monastery there since the 8th century. It was probably taken over by Céli Dé monks in the 9th or 10th centuries, and these survive into the 14th century. It is the Gaelic abbey, rather than the continental priory, that the abbot was in charge of; the importance of the Céli Dé abbey has come down into the modern era in the street names of St. Andrews.

Only a few abbots are known. It is often thought that the position of Abbot and Bishop were the same until the Norman era, but clear evidence for this is lacking.

List of known bishops

The pre-11th century "bishop of the Scots" may have had no fixed seat before finally settling at St Andrews.

List of archbishops
The bishopric of St Andrews was elevated into an archbishopric in 1472 by Pope Sixtus IV. The Scottish church broke with Rome in the Scottish Reformation of 1560.

See also
 Archbishop of Saint Andrews and Edinburgh (for modern Catholic Archbishopric of St Andrews and Edinburgh)
 Bishop of St Andrews, Dunkeld and Dunblane (for modern Episcopalian Bishopric of St Andrews, Dunkeld and Dunblane)

References

 Anderson, Alan Orr, Early Sources of Scottish History: AD 500–1286, 2 Vols, (Edinburgh, 1922), vol. i
 Anderson, Marjorie Ogilvie, "St. Andrews before Alexander I", in G. W. S. Barrow (ed.), The Scottish Tradition, (Edinburgh, 1994), pp. 1–13
 Barrow, G. W. S., "The Clergy of St. Andrews", in The Kingdom of the Scots, 2nd Ed., (Edinburgh, 2003), pp. 187–202
 Dowden, John, The Bishops of Scotland, ed. J. Maitland Thomson, (Glasgow, 1912)
 Keith, Robert, An Historical Catalogue of the Scottish Bishops: Down to the Year 1688, (London, 1824)
 Lawrie, Sir Archibald, Early Scottish Charters Prior to A.D. 1153, (Glasgow, 1905)
 Macqueen, John, MacQueen, Winifred & Watt, D.E.R. (eds.), Scottichronicon by Walter Bower in Latin and English, Vol. 3, (Aberdeen, 1995)
 Watt, D. E. R., Fasti Ecclesiae Scotinanae Medii Aevi ad annum 1638, 2nd Draft, (St Andrews, 1969)
 Watt, D. E. R., Fasti Ecclesiae Scotinanae Medii Aevi ad annum 1638, Revised Edition, Scottish Record Society, (Edinburgh, 2003)

St Andrews
Religion in Fife
History of Fife
 
Guardians of Scotland
St Andrews
878 establishments
9th-century establishments in Scotland
1689 disestablishments in Scotland
People associated with Fife